Leucaena magnifica is a species of plant in the family Fabaceae. It is found only in Guatemala.

References

magnifica
Endemic flora of Guatemala
Endangered flora of North America
Taxonomy articles created by Polbot